RMS Antonia and her sister ship Andania were the first two of the six 14,000 ton "A" ocean liners built for Cunard in the early 1920s.

Antonia was built by Vickers Ltd., and launched in 1921. She made her maiden voyage from London to Montreal on 15 June 1922. She remained on Cunard's London-Canada service until 1928, when she joined Andania on the Cunard/Anchor/Donaldson joint service. Antonia, too, was requisitioned during World War II, and served as a troop transport and later as an armed merchant cruiser. She was purchased by the Admiralty as a repair ship in 1942, and renamed Wayland. She was scrapped in 1948.

External links
 Cunard Line RMS Antonia
 Cabin Liners: Cunard's "A"-Class Liners 1922

Ships built in Barrow-in-Furness
Passenger ships of the United Kingdom
1921 ships
Ships of the Cunard Line